Disco 2 (or Disco Two) was a BBC2 television music show that ran between January 1970 and July 1971.  It was the successor to Colour Me Pop and the precursor of The Old Grey Whistle Test.  The earliest programmes were billed as Line Up's Disco 2, the programme – like Colour Me Pop before it – originally being a spin-off of Late Night Line-Up.

The series was produced by Rowan Ayers (the father of musician Kevin Ayers) and directed by Granville Jenkins.  The regular presenter of the first series was Tommy Vance, who was replaced for the second series by Pete Drummond; other presenters used occasionally included Mike Harding, Richard Williams and Mike Raven.  The theme music was initially by Elton John. This was later replaced with the opening riff of Led Zeppelin's "Moby Dick".  Programmes were initially broadcast on Saturday evenings, later occasionally moving to Friday evening and then Thursday evening.

Only a few performances from the show are known to survive.

Appearances

First series
 10 January 1970: Joe Cocker, Lou Christie, Elton John 
 17 January 1970: Procol Harum, Juicy Lucy, The Peddlers
 24 January 1970: Chicken Shack 
 31 January 1970: Pentangle, Richie Havens
 7 February 1970: Taste, Jimmy Ruffin
 14 February 1970: Wild Angels
 21 February 1970: The Strawbs, Judas Jump
 28 February 1970: Blodwyn Pig
 7 March 1970: The Tremeloes, Fleetwood Mac
 14 March 1970: The Faces, Toe Fat
 21 March 1970: Slade, The Keef Hartley Band
 28 March 1970: Yes, The Move
 4 April 1970: Fairport Convention, Hookfoot
 11 April 1970: Honeybus
 18 April 1970: Juicy Lucy 
 25 April 1970: Slade, Legend
 2 May 1970: Pretty Things, Trader Horne 
 9 May 1970: Family, Groundhogs
16 May 1970: Buddy Knox, Daddy Longlegs
23 May 1970: Stone the Crows, Duster Bennett
30 May 1970: Fleetwood Mac, Quintessence
6 June 1970: Groundhogs
13 June 1970: Free, Bobby Darin 
20 June 1970: Procol Harum, Affinity
27 June 1970: The Roy Young Band, Audience 
4 July 1970: "Bob Dylan Special" 
11 July 1970: Alan Bown, Justine, Steeleye Span 
25 July 1970: Matthews Southern Comfort, Mighty Baby, Savoy Brown

Second series
 12 September 1970: Humble Pie, Taste, Melanie
 19 September 1970: Strawbs, Caravan, Kris Kristofferson
 26 September 1970: Quiver, Turley Richards
 3 October 1970: Eric Burdon, The Mark-Almond Band, Orange Bicycle
 10 October 1970: Bridget St John, Mott The Hoople
 17 October 1970: Love Affair, Rare Bird, U.F.O., Jimmy Campbell & Peter Campbell
 24 October 1970: Stone The Crows
 31 October 1970: Slade, The Move, Clarence Carter, Sweet Box
 7 November 1970: Cat Stevens, Good News
 14 November 1970: Duncan Browne, Dream Police, Genesis, Zoo
 21 November 1970: Curved Air, Fleetwood Mac, Curtis Mayfield
 27 November 1970: Trapeze, Lindisfarne, Jonathan Kelly, Satisfaction
 5 December 1970: James Taylor, Wishbone Ash
 12 December 1970: Golden Earring, High Broom, Which What, Ray Fenwick
 19 December 1970: Elton John
 2 January 1971: Compilation programme
 9 January 1971: Bill Fay, Stephen Stills, Tear Gas, Van der Graaf Generator
 16 January 1971: Juicy Lucy, Livingston Taylor
 23 January 1971: The Roy Young Band, Bronco
 30 January 1971: Yes, Rod Demmick, Herbie Armstrong
 25 February 1971: Nico, Argent, Tom Gerricky
 4 March 1971: Graham Bond, Trees
 11 March 1971: Atomic Rooster, Fairweather, Leon Russell
 18 March 1971: The Alan Bown, Patto
 25 March 1971: Jade, Stray
 1 April 1971 Leon Russell & Friends
 8 April 1971: Stray, Quintessence, Yvonne Elliman
 15 April 1971: Mott The Hoople, Seals and Crofts, Hookfoot
 22 April 1971: The Faces
 29 April 1971: Loudon Wainwright III, Cochise
 6 May 1971: The Keef Hartley Band, Seals and Crofts
 13 May 1971: Allan Taylor, Warhorse
 20 May 1971: James Taylor, Livingston Taylor, Uriah Heep
 27 May 1971: The Byrds
 3 June 1971: Assagai, Arthur 'Big Boy' Crudup, blues documentary feature
 10 June 1971: Gordon Lightfoot
 17 June 1971: Loudon Wainwright III, Help Yourself, Ernie Graham
 24 June 1971: Iain Matthews, Stefan Grossman
 1 July 1971: Brewer and Shipley
 8 July 1971: Heaven

References

1970 British television series debuts
1971 British television series endings
BBC Television shows
Rock music television series
1970s British music television series